The Revolutionary and Popular Indoamericano Front (in Spanish: Frente Indoamericano Revolucionario y Popular, FRIP) was a political movement in Argentina, founded by Francisco René Santucho in 1958 at Santiago del Estero, Argentina. It was a nationalist, indigenist and revolutionary movement, inspired in part by the ideas of the Peruvian Víctor Raúl Haya de la Torre. It was an antecedent of the Workers' Revolutionary Party.

See also
Víctor Raúl Haya de la Torre
Workers' Revolutionary Party
People's Revolutionary Army (Argentina)

References
"Los testimonios te hacen pensar desde otro lugar", Página 12
"LA VIDA DEL JEFE DEL MARXISTA EJERCITO REVOLUCIONARIO DEL PUEBLO: Un líder formado entre libros y violencia", Clarín

Defunct political parties in Argentina
Nationalist parties in South America
Argentine nationalism
Indigenist political parties in South America
Political parties established in 1958
1958 establishments in Argentina
Political parties with year of disestablishment missing